Tea (in reference to food, rather than the drink) has long been used as an umbrella term for several different meals. English writer Isabella Beeton, whose books on home economics were widely read in the 19th century, describes meals of various kinds and provides menus for the "old-fashioned tea", the "at-home tea", the "family tea", and the "high tea".

Teatime is the time at which this meal is usually eaten, which is mid-afternoon to early evening. Tea as a meal is associated with the United Kingdom and some Commonwealth countries. Many people in Britain and Australia refer to their main evening meal as "tea" rather than "dinner" or "supper", but generally, with the exception of Scotland and Northern England, "tea" refers to a light meal or a snack. A tea break is the term used for a work break in either the morning or afternoon for a cup of tea or other beverage. 

The most common elements of the tea meal are the drink itself, with cakes or pastries (especially scones), bread and jam, and perhaps sandwiches; these are the pillars of the "traditional afternoon tea" meals offered by expensive London hotels. Other types of both drink and food may be offered at home, under the same name, tea.

Historic usage

The timing of the "tea" meal has moved over the centuries in response to the migration of the main meal, dinner. Until the late 18th century dinner was eaten at what is now called "lunchtime", or in the early afternoon; supper was a later and lighter meal. Gradually, dinner began to migrate, amid much controversy, until by about 1900 it arrived at its present timing in the evening. At first, the "tea" meal was often in the early evening, some three or four hours after mid-day dinner; another version of the tea meal was even later, after a supper and before bed.

In 1804 Alexandre Balthazar Laurent Grimod de La Reynière wrote (in French) about afternoon tea in Switzerland:
Towards five o'clock in the evening, the mistress of the house, in the midst of the sitting-room, makes tea herself, very strong and barely sweetened with a few drops of rich cream; generous slices of buttered bread accompany it. Such is the Swiss Tea in all its simplicity. In most opulent houses, however, coffee and light pastries of all kinds are added, many of which are unknown in Paris, preserved or candied fruits, macaroons, biscuits, nougat, and even ice cream.

Observance of the custom originated amongst the wealthy social classes in England in the 1840s. Anna Maria, Duchess of Bedford, is widely credited with inventing afternoon tea in England as a late-afternoon meal whilst visiting Belvoir Castle in Leicestershire in 1840. This legend may have been furthered by the 1882 memoir of the actress Fanny Kemble, who wrote: "My first introduction to ‘afternoon tea’ took place during this visit to Belvoir [in 1842]. I do not believe that the now universally-honoured institution of ‘five o'clock tea’ dates further back than this." The Oxford English Dictionary (which quotes Kemble) provides citations dating back a century before the putative Belvoir coinage, in reference to tea as a social gathering. The earliest is from Jonathan Swift's satirical etiquette guide, A Complete Collection of Genteel and Ingenious Conversation (1738), "Whether they meet..at Meals, Tea, or Visits". In Fanny Burney's 1778 novel Evelina, the heroine writes that "I was relieved by a summons to tea". John Wesley and Harriet Martineau also are quoted.  Philosopher Thomas Carlyle and his wife Jane Welsh Carlyle invited guests for 7 pm to their teas in the 1850s, although "afternoon tea" before dinner was also becoming established by this time.

By the end of the 19th century, afternoon tea developed in its current form and was observed by both the upper and middle classes. It had become ubiquitous, even in the isolated village in the fictionalised memoir Lark Rise to Candleford, where a cottager prepares what she calls a "visitor's tea" for their landlady: "the table was laid... there were the best tea things with a fat pink rose on the side of each cup; hearts of lettuce, thin bread and butter, and the crisp little cakes that had been baked in readiness that morning."

Commercial establishments known as teahouses or tearooms (similar to a coffeehouse) were once common in the UK, but they have declined in popularity since WWII. A.B.C. tea shops and Lyons Corner Houses were successful chains of such establishments, and played a role in opening up possibilities for Victorian women. A list of significant tea houses in Britain gives more examples. They served light snacks or full meals all day, some of them late into the evening. They were well-lit and did not serve alcohol.

Afternoon tea 

Afternoon tea is a light meal typically eaten between 3:30 pm and 5 pm. Traditionally it consisted of thinly-sliced bread and butter, delicate sandwiches (customarily cucumber sandwiches or egg and cress sandwiches) and usually cakes and pastries (such as Battenberg cake or Victoria sponge). Scones (with clotted cream and jam) would also be served (as they are for cream tea). The sandwiches are usually crustless, cut into small segments, either as triangles or fingers, and pressed thin. Biscuits are not usually served. 

Nowadays, a formal afternoon tea is more of a special occasion, taken as a treat in a hotel. The food is often served on a tiered stand ('serving tower'); there may be no sandwiches, but bread or scones with butter and jam, or toast, muffins or crumpets. 

Formal afternoon tea remains a popular tradition in the Commonwealth, particularly at fine hotels. An example is the Hotel Café Royal in Piccadilly, London where the Oscar Wilde Lounge provides a traditional afternoon tea service. Themed teas are also popular in Britain, for example an Alice in Wonderland themed afternoon tea at the Egerton House Hotel, Peter Pan afternoon tea at Aqua Shard, London, Beatles afternoon tea at Hard Days Night Hotel, Liverpool, Sherlock Holmes afternoon tea and mini mystery at The Mind Palace, London, Charlie and the Chocolate Factory afternoon tea at One Aldwych, London, and Cadbury Chocolate afternoon tea at Cadbury World, Birmingham. Afternoon tea ceremonies at Canada's grand railway hotels are a well-known tradition across the country.

Cream tea 

This snack is associated with the West Country, i.e. Cornwall, Devon, Dorset and Somerset. It usually consists of scones, clotted cream, strawberry jam, and tea to drink. Some venues will provide butter instead of clotted cream. In Australia, this is commonly referred to as Devonshire Tea.

Evening high tea 
"High tea" is an evening meal, sometimes associated with the working class but in reality enjoyed by all social classes, in particular after sports matches, especially cricket. It is typically eaten between 5 pm and 7 pm. This was also sometimes called a "meat-tea" in the past.

In most of the United Kingdom (namely, the North of England, North and South Wales, the English Midlands, Scotland, and some rural and working class areas of Northern Ireland), people traditionally call their midday meal dinner and their evening meal tea (served around 6 pm), whereas the upper social classes would call the midday meal lunch or luncheon and the evening meal (served after 7 pm) dinner (if formal) or supper (if informal). This differentiation in usage is one of the classic social markers of British English (see U and non-U English). However, in most of the South of England, the midday meal is "lunch", with "dinner" being the evening meal, regardless of social class.

High tea typically consists of a savoury dish (either something hot, or cold cuts of meat such as ham salad), followed by cakes and bread, butter and jam. In The Cambridge Social History of Britain, 1750–1950, high tea is defined thus:
the central feature was the extension of a meal based predominantly on bread, butter and tea by the inclusion of some kind of fish or meat usually cooked in a frying pan.

A stereotypical expression "You'll have had your tea", meaning "I imagine you have already eaten", is used to parody people from Edinburgh as being rather stingy with hospitality. A BBC Radio 4 comedy series of this name was made by Graeme Garden and Barry Cryer.

Australian, South African and New Zealand

In South Africa and New Zealand, and historically in Australia, a small informal social gathering usually at someone's home for tea and a light meal (e.g. biscuits, scones, or slices of cake or sandwiches) in the mid-afternoon is referred to as "afternoon tea". More generally, any light meal or snack taken at mid-afternoon, with or without tea or another hot drink, may also be referred to as "afternoon tea". When taken at mid-morning instead of mid-afternoon, the term "morning tea" is used in place of "afternoon tea" in Australia and New Zealand. These usages have declined in popularity in recent years, in tandem with the rise in coffee culture, particularly in Australia. The term high tea is now used in the southern hemisphere to describe formal afternoon teas. Formal afternoon teas are often held outside the private home in commercial tea rooms, function venues, hotels, or similar.

In Australia and New Zealand, a break from work or school taken at mid-morning is frequently known as "morning tea". A smoko, originally meaning a cigarette break, is also used as slang for a tea break, especially for people working in manual work.

See also 

 Merienda, the Hispanic analogue
 Tea culture
 Tea dance
 Tea in the United Kingdom
 Tea lady, an employee in a hospital or place of work
 Tea set, the tea pot, sugar bowl, milk jug, etc.
 Tiffin
 Elevenses
 Palm court, a room in a hotel where tea dances took place

References

Further reading

Flanders, Judith, The Victorian House: Domestic Life from Childbirth to Deathbed, 2003, Harper Perennial, 
 

Meals
Tea culture
Tea in the United Kingdom